Andrzej Kmicic is best known as a fictional character created by Henryk Sienkiewicz featured in the novel The Deluge. He is a typical szlachcic (Polish-Lithuanian noble) from the Polish–Lithuanian Commonwealth; unruly yet patriotic. During the course of the books, he transforms from a villain to a hero.

The 1991–92 Copernicus Society translation by W.S. Kuniczak calls the character Andrei Kmita, rather than Andrzej Kmicic.

The moral transformation of Kmicic is similar to the transformation of Prince Roman from Joseph Conrad's book.

Samuel Kmicic may have served as the prototype of Andrzej Kmicic.

References

Literary characters introduced in 1884
Sienkiewicz's Trilogy
Fictional Polish people
Characters in novels of the 19th century
Fictional characters based on real people